The Marion Barons were a minor league professional ice hockey team in the International Hockey League during the 1953–54 season. The Barons were based in Marion, Ohio, played at Veterans Memorial Coliseum, and were a farm team of the Cleveland Barons. The Barons placed second in the league their only season, and featured four players who reached the National Hockey League; Armand Delmonte, Ott Heller, Johnny Ingoldsby and Tony Poeta.

Results

External links
Marion Barons statistics
List of NHL alumni

International Hockey League (1945–2001) teams
Marion, Ohio
Defunct ice hockey teams in the United States
Ice hockey clubs established in 1953
Ice hockey clubs disestablished in 1954
1953 establishments in Ohio
Ice hockey teams in Ohio
1954 disestablishments in Ohio